The Men's Marathon at the 2009 World Championships in Athletics took place on August 22, 2009 in the streets of Berlin, Germany.

Medalists

Abbreviations
All times shown are in hours:minutes:seconds

Records

Qualification standard

Schedule

Intermediates

Results

See also
 2009 World Marathon Cup

References

Marathon results (Archived 2009-09-08). IAAF. Retrieved on 2009-08-16.

Men's Marathon
Marathons at the World Athletics Championships
World Championships
Men's marathons
Marathons in Germany